Jane Robinson may refer to:
Jane Bancroft Robinson (born 1847), author and educator
Jane J. Robinson (1918–2015), American computational linguist
Jane W. Robinson (born 1926), American politician
James Robinson (filk musician) (born 1948), American musician previously known as Dr Jane Robinson
Jane Robinson (historian) (born 1959), British social historian
Jane Robinson (rower) (born 1969), Australian rower
Jane Robinson (cyclist) (born 1969), 1974 winner of United States National Road Race Championships
Jane Robinson (costume designer), Oscar-nominated costume designer